Moradabad-e Posht Rig (also Romanized as Morādābād-e Posht Rīg) is a village in Chahdegal Rural District, Negin Kavir District, Fahraj County, Kerman Province, Iran. At the 2006 census, its population was 88, in 17 families.

References 

Populated places in Fahraj County